William I of Sabran (between 1055 and 1105) was a Crusader from the House of Sabran who joined the army of Raymond of Saint-Gilles in October 1095 during the First Crusade.

First Crusade
During the Battle of Antioch, Raymond IV of Toulouse decided to defend the fort of Mahomerie, then he chose his best captains to defend him: Pierre of Castillon, Raymond I of Turenne, William V of Montpellier, William I of Sabran and Gouffier of Lastours, in addition to 500 most valiant men of their troops. He was among the sixty crusaders who defended a bridge against Kerbogha's army. He was one of the first to enter the city, and took as prisoner the sons of the governor of the place.

During the siege of Jerusalem in July 1099, nine Genoese vessels arrived at the port of Jaffa to support the crusaders. Hence, the Count of Toulouse wanted to protect them, in which he sent Raymond Pilet d'Alès, William I of Sabran, and Raymond of Turenne at the head of 50 horsemen.

William I would marry his cousin Adalasie Amic, daughter of Pierre Amic and Agnès of Avignon, the descendant of Louis Boson the Blind, King of Provence, and great-granddaughter of Louis the Pious and of Anne of Constantinople. His son William of Châteauneuf, married Constance Amic, the granddaughter of Pierre Amic and Agnes of Avignon.

William I was known for having built the “Charterhouse of Valbonne”, which was in a forest between La Roque and Goudargues.

References

Bibliography

11th-century births
12th-century deaths
Year of birth uncertain
Year of death uncertain
Christians of the First Crusade